Lea Newbold is a former civil parish, now in the parish of Aldford and Saighton, in Cheshire West and Chester, England. It contains three buildings that are recorded in the National Heritage List for England as designated listed buildings, all of which are at Grade II. This grade is the lowest of the three gradings given to listed buildings and is applied to "buildings of national importance and special interest". The parish is entirely rural, and the listed buildings consist of two farmhouses and a farm building.

See also

Listed buildings in Aldford
Listed buildings in Churton by Aldford
Listed buildings in Churton by Farndon
Listed buildings in Coddington
Listed buildings in Eaton
Listed buildings in Eccleston
Listed buildings in Golborne David
 
Listed buildings in Handley
Listed buildings in Huntington
Listed buildings in Poulton
Listed buildings in Pulford

Listed buildings in Rowton
Listed buildings in Saighton
Listed buildings in Waverton

References

Listed buildings in Cheshire West and Chester
Lists of listed buildings in Cheshire